Maximilian Eduard August Hannibal Kunz Sigismund Vogel von Fal(c)kenstein (29 April 1839 – 7 December 1917) was a Prussian General der Infanterie and politician.

Falckenstein was born in Berlin as the son of the Prussian general Eduard Vogel von Falckenstein and Luise Gärtner. He married Marie Freiin von Stoltzenberg (15 September 1842 – 2 October 1915) in Koblenz on 3 September 1862.

Falckenstein was lord of the estate Gut Dolzig, which encompassed 10 square kilometres. He entered the Prussian Army in 1855, becoming a captain of the Great General Staff in 1871 and an instructor at the Prussian Military Academy in 1881. He was promoted to Generalmajor in 1888 and named the commander of the 2. Garde-Infanterie-Brigade. Falckenstein became director of the General War Department within the Ministry of War in 1889. A year later, he was promoted to Generalleutnant and appointed to serve as the commander of the 5th Division.

In 1896, Falckenstein was promoted to General der Infanterie, becoming the commanding general of the VIII. Armeekorps in Koblenz, as well as head of the Engineer and Pioneer Corps. He died at his estate of Dolzig.

References

1839 births
1917 deaths
German untitled nobility
Politicians from Berlin
People from the Province of Brandenburg
Generals of Infantry (Prussia)
Members of the Prussian House of Lords
Military personnel from Berlin
Recipients of the Order of Franz Joseph
Order of the Dannebrog